Abacetus birmanus is a species of ground beetle in the subfamily Pterostichinae. It was described by Henry Walter Bates in 1890.

References

birmanus
Beetles described in 1890